The United Church of Christ of Highlandlake is a historic church near Mead, Colorado.  It was listed on the National Register of Historic Places in 1989.

It has stained glass windows, which were not common among the wood-frame churches on Colorado's plains.

Built in 1896, the church is typical of Eastern Colorado's wooden-frame vernacular churches of the era. The Highlandlake United Church of Christ congregation formed in 1881; until it was able to raise the money for a church building, it met in the town's school. Mary G. Bumstead, the church's first permanent minister and a rare example of a woman leading a congregation at the time, was instrumental in the church's fundraising efforts. The church features a clapboard exterior, a belfry, and stained glass windows; the latter are uncommon in vernacular churches due to their expense, and were funded through gifts Bumstead solicited. The church is the last original community building in Highlandlake, as most of its residents moved to Mead when the railroad bypassed Highlandlake.

References

Churches in Colorado
Churches on the National Register of Historic Places in Colorado
Churches completed in 1896
Churches in Weld County, Colorado
National Register of Historic Places in Weld County, Colorado